Swansea Harriers Athletics Club is an athletics club based at Swansea University Athletics Centre in Swansea, Wales, UK.

History
Although athletics has taken place in Swansea since at least the late 19th century it was not until 1962 that the current Swansea Harriers was formally established. Since then the club has produced Great Britain and Welsh international athletes in age groups from junior to senior and won Welsh and British titles at Club level. The Harriers were voted "UK Athletics Club of the Year in 2009" and will celebrate its 50th anniversary in London Olympic Year 2012.

The Club currently has about 600 members and participates in Track & Field, Cross Country, Road Running, Race Walking and Fell Running.

Members
Philippa Roles – Olympic discus thrower (Athens 2004 and Beijing 2008)
Dai Greene – World Championships – 400m Hurdles Finalist (Berlin 2009), gold medalist (Daegu 2011). European Championships – 400m Hurdles gold medalist (Barcelona 2010). Commonwealth Games – 400m Hurdles gold medalist (Dehli 2010)
Ian Hamer – Olympic 5000m (Barcelona 1992)
Hayley Tullett – World Championships – 1500m bronze medalist (2003) and Olympics (2000 and Athens 2004)
Josh Griffiths - World Championship (London 2017)

Competitions
In track and field the Club competes in the British Athletics League and the UK Women's Athletic League and the Welsh Senior League. Junior athletes compete in the Welsh Junior League, the National Young Athletes League and the National Junior League as well as regional and national championships.

In Cross Country all age groups take part in the Gwent Cross Country League and regional and national championships while senior athletes also take part in the West Glamorgan Cross Country League.

In Road Running the Club takes part in the National 12 Stage (Men) and 6 Stage (Women) Road Relays in Sutton Park, Birmingham as well as the 6/4 Stage Relays in October. Athletes take part in road races across the UK, as well as national and regional championships and the London Marathon. The Club also enters a masters team in the annual Welsh Castles Road Relay held annually in June.

Training
Training takes place on most evenings, with the main Club nights being Tuesday and Thursday. The Club is based at the athletics track at Sketty Lane, Swansea University and also utilises the adjoining indoor athletics facility.

Endurance athletes utilise Swansea Bay with sessions taking place at Swansea Beach, Singleton Park, Clyne Valley, Swansea promenade as well as longer weekend runs to the Gower.

External links
 Swansea Harriers A.C. Official Website
 Swansea Harriers A.C. Emyew Listing

Athletics clubs in Wales
Athletics
Athletics
Sports clubs established in 1955
Running clubs in the United Kingdom
1955 establishments in Wales